The 1846 East Suffolk by-election was held on 19 February 1846 after the resignation of the incumbent Peelite MP, John Henniker-Major.  He was succeeded by the unopposed Protectionist Conservative candidate, Edward Sherlock Gooch who was backed by the other Suffolk MP, Lord Rendlesham.

References

Unopposed by-elections to the Parliament of the United Kingdom in English constituencies
1846 elections in the United Kingdom
1846 in England
East
February 1846 events